Kleinkötz is a village near Günzburg in Bavaria in Germany, the site of a post World War II American sector displaced person camp (see also Scouting in displaced persons camps). It is the birthplace of Johann Eberlin von Günzburg.

Villages in Bavaria
Populated places in Günzburg (district)